Arkady Shilkloper (born 17 October 1956) is a Russian multi-instrumentalist (horn, alphorn, flugelhorn, corno da caccia, didgeridoo, shofar, and others) and composer, currently living in Berlin. He is known as one of the best jazz performers on horn. and alphorn

Biography

Shilkloper was born in Moscow and started playing alto horn at the age of six  and switched to horn in 1967. At the age of eleven he entered the Moscow Military Music School. After two years of military service (1974-76), he studied at the Moscow Gnessin Institute (Gnessin Russian Academy of Music; 1976-81). At the same time he began his career in the orchestra of the Bolshoi Theatre (1978-85) and also began his first jazz activities.

In 1984, he formed a duo with his colleague from the Bolshoi Theatre, bassist Mikhail Karetnikow, with whom he recorded the LP "Move". (Melodiya, С60 26043 003). From 1985-89, he played with A. Kirichenko and S. Letov in the band Tri-O (LP "Three Holes"). At the same period he was a member of the Moscow Philharmonic Orchestra. 

Since 1986, he has collaborated with pianist Mikhail Alperin. Their first album, "Wave of Sorrow" (1990), was the first russian album on ECM. Later, Shilkloper participated in three more Alperin recordings for ECM: «North Story» (1997), «First Impression» (1999) and «Her First Dance» (2008).

In 1990, the Alperin-Shilkloper duo invited Sergey Starostin, a Moscow Conservatory-educated clarinetist and a researcher of Russian authentic folklore music, which results in the creation of Moscow Art Trio. The trio tours regularly, though its members now live in three different countries; it is one of the most interesting and well-known Ethno Jazz groups from Russia. In Russia, their albums were released by Boheme Music; in Europe by Jaro.

In 1990, Shilkloper visited US for the first time. According to Leonard Feather from the Los Angeles Times, "the Soviet horn virtuoso was one of four Jazzmen from the Soviet Union who arrived here last week to take part in the 23rd annual University of Idaho Jazz Festival at his home town's namesake city. Shilkloper, 33, on his first visit to the United States was the artistic sensation of the four-day event."

Since 1995, Arkady Shilkloper plays in Pago Libre with Austrian violinist Tscho Theissing, Swiss pianist John Wolf Brennan and Austrian bassist Georg Breinschmid (since January 2012, new member on double bass: Tom Götze from Dresden).

Since 1998, Arkady has played the alphorn. His "Pilatus", "Presente Para Moscou" and "Zum Gipfel und zurück" albums feature a lot of his alphorn playing. In 1998-2002, Shilkloper performed with Europe's leading big band, the Vienna Art Orchestra. In 2000, Arkady put together the Mauve Trio with Alegre Corrêa (guitar) and Georg Breinschmid (double bass). Their debut album "Mauve" (Quinton Records, 2002) was awarded the prestigious Hans Koller Prize of Austria as the "CD of the Year".

In 2004, he gave the first performance of the Concerto for Alphorn and Orchestra of Daniel Schnyder, a work commissioned by the Menuhin Festival in Gstaad. In 2012, he started a collaboration with overtone singer Christian Zehnder and John Wolf Brennan.

In 2015, Jazzahead presented his duet with the young Ukrainian jazz pianist Vadim Neselovskyi.

In 2019, the Advisory Council of the International Horn Society in recognition of significant contribution to the science and art of the Horn designated Arkady Shilkloper as an Honorary Member of the International Horn Society with all the Rights, Privileges and Honors thereunto.

Shilkloper has mastered extended techniques for both the horn and the alphorn. According to Leonard Feather, his control of the horn and his creativity have set a new standard.

Discography

Solo albums 

 1996 – "Hornology" (RDM 6 06 144, Boheme Music CDBMR 809016) Russia
 2000 – "Pilatus" (Boheme Music CDBMR 906063) Russia
 2003 – "Presente para Moscou" (Dom Records); reissued in 2005 (JARO 4264-2) Germany
 2006 – "Zum Gipfel und zuruck. Neue Alphornmusik" (MIGROS/Musiques suisses MGB CD 6246) Switzerland
 2008 – "Portrait" Russia
 2010 – "Live in DOM" (Dom Records) Russia
 2015 – "Owner of a Lonely Horn" Symphonic Tribute to YES (ArtBeat Music) Russia

With Misha Alperin 
1990 — Alperin / Shilkloper «Wave of Sorrow» (ECM 1990) Germany
1993 —  Alperin / Shilkloper «Live in Grenoble» (RDM 3 05 015), 1998 (Boheme Music CDBMR 809006) Russia
1997 — Mikhail Alperin «North Story» (ECM 1596) Germany
1999 — Mikhail Alperin «First Impression» (ECM 1664) Germany
2008 — Misha Alperin «Her First Dance» (ECM 1995) Germany

With Vadim Neselovskyi
2013 — Arkady Shilkloper / Vadim Neselovskyi «Last Snow» (ArtBeat Music AB-CD-06-2013-052) Russia

2015 — Arkady Shilkloper / Vadim Neselovskyi «Krai» (Neuklang NCD4109) Germany

2017 — Arkady Shilkloper / Vadim Neselovskyi «Lustrum» (Neuklang NCD4147) Germany

With Moscow Art Trio 
1993 — Moscow Art Trio «Prayer» (RDM 3 01 006 и Boheme Music CDBMR 809009) Russia; (Silex Y225039) France; (JARO 4193-2) Germany
1995 — Mikhail Alperin «Folk Dreams» (JARO 4187-2) Germany
1996 — Moscow Art Trio «Hamburg Concert» (JARO 4201-2) Germany
1998 — Moscow Art Trio «Music» (JARO 4214-2) Germany
1998 — Moscow Art Trio «Live In Karlsruhe» (Boheme Music CDBMR 809010) Russia
1998 — The Bulgarian Voices «Angelite» & Moscow Art Trio with Huun-Huur-Tu «Mountain Tale» (JARO 4212-2) Germany
2001 — Moscow Art Trio «Once Upon a Time» (JARO 4238-2) Germany
2006 — Moscow Art Trio «Instead of Making Children» (JARO 4274-2) Germany
2008 — Moscow Art Trio & Norwegian Chamber Orchestra «Village Variations» (JARO 4290-2) Germany
2009 — Moscow Art Trio «Live in Holland»  (CDDOMA 091102) Russia; (JARO 4302-2) Germany
2010 — The Bulgarian Voices Angelite with Huun-Huur-Tu & Moscow Art Trio «Legend» (JARO 4300-2) Germany

With Pago Libre 
1996 — Pago Libre «Pago Libre» (Bellaphon L+R 45105) Germany. 2002, (Leo CD LR 354) England
1999 — Pago Libre «Wake Up Call» Live in Italy (Leo CD LR 272) England
2001 — Pago Libre Cinemagique/Fifteen Soundtracks For An Imaginary Cinema" (TCB-The Montreux Label 01112) Switzerland
2003 — Pago Libre «Phoenix/Live in Salzburg & Zurich» (Leo CD LR 377) England
2005 — Pago Libre «Stepping Out» (Leo CD LR 444) England
2008 — Pago Libre Sextett «PlatzDADA» (Christoph Merian Verlag) Switzerland
2009 — Pago Libre «Fake Folk» (Zappel Music ZM 0017) Austria
2018 — Pago Libre & Friends «got hard» (Leo CD LR 835) England
2019 — Pago Libre «Cinémagique 2.0» (Leo Cd LR 863) England
2020 — Pago Libre «Mountain Songlines» (Leo CD LR 886) England
2020 — Pago Libre Sextett «PlatzDADA» (Leo CD LR 887) England
2021 — Pago Libre & Sooon «FriendShip» (Leo CD LR 919) England

Other projects
1986 — Arkady Shilkloper / Mikhail Karetnikov «Move» (Melodia С60 26043 003, LP) Russia
1988 — Rhapsody in Russia A Gershwin Celebration (Sheffeld Lab CD-28) USA 
1989 — Три-О «Three Holes» (Melodia С60-28461) Russia 
1994 — Moscow Composers Orchestra «Kings and Cabbages» (Leo Lab 005) England 
1994 — Kim Kristensen & Ildvaeverne (Storyville STCD 4193) Denmark 
1994 — Christian Muthspiel «Octet Ost II» (Amadeo 521 823) Austria 
1995 — Три-О «Trialogue» (SoLyd SLR 0031) Russia 
1996 — Arkady Shilkloper Acoustic Quartet «BRASS COMPLOT» (Ermatel Records JCD 020) and 1998 (Boheme Music CDBMR 809008) Russia 
1996 — Karl Berger Orchestra «No Man Is An Island» (Douglas Music ADC4/Knitting Factory) USA 
1996 — Baltic Art Orchestra LIVE AT JAZZ BALTIKA FESTIVAL 1994 SALZAU  (Sonore Records SN021 CD)
1998 — Arkady Shilkloper/ Vladimir Volkov/ Sergey Starostin «XIX98» (Boheme Music CDBMR 810029) Russia 
1998 — Volkovtrio & Arkady Shilkloper «Fragment» (SoLyd SLR 013) Russia 
1998 — Volkovtrio «Much Better» (Green Wave Records) Russia 
1998 — Arkady Shilkloper / Andrey Kondakov / Vladimir Volkov / Christian Scheuber «Live In Norway» (Boheme Music CDBMR 809007) Russia 
1998 — Arkady Shilkloper & Acoustic Quartet «The Brass Complot» (Ermatell Records JCD 020 and Boheme Music CDBMR 809008) Russia 
1998 — Moscow Composers Orchestra  «Kharms – 10 – INCIDENTS» (CDLA 05019) Russia 
1999 — «Rhapsody In Russia: A Gershwin Celebration» (Sheffield Lab CD-28) USA
1999 — Stefano Maltese Open Sound Ensemble «Living Alive» (Leo Records 265) England 
1999 — Bendik Hofseth – Smilets Historie. "Jerusalem" (Sonet – SCD 15128) Norway
1999 — Andrei Razin & The Second Approach «Pierrot» (Boheme Music CDBMR 904056) Russia 
2000 — Andreas Willers Octet «The Ground Music» (Enja ENJ-9368 2) Germany 
2000 — Kondakov / Volkov / Shilkloper «Outline» (Boheme Music CDBMR 912119) and Leo Records CD LR 620 (2011) Russia and England 
2001 — Yuri Goloubev «Toremar Island» (Landy Star) Russia
2001 — Shilkloper / Correa / Breinschmid «Mauve» (Quinton 0106-2) Austria 
2002 — «Afrodynamix» (ATS-Records CD-0550) Austria 
2004 — Er.J.Orchestra «The Unicorn» (44 records) Ukraine
2005 — VSP orkestra & Arkady Shilkloper CD LP (OCTA PROD label ref:ORK 002) France
2005 — TONS izabel padovani ronaldo saggiorato (GIL0505-1) Austria
2005 — Sensationelles Alphorn (Tell Music AG TM0510022) Switzerland
2006 — Vladimir Tarasov's Russian Orchestra, Live from Salzau at 10.06.1995 (Strange Sound Records SSR 06014)
2007 — Niels Klein Tentett "The Last Soup" (JHM 163) Germany 
2008 — Vince Mendoza «BLAUKLANG» (ACT 9465-2) Germany 
2009 — Geir Lysne Ensemble "The Grieg Code"  (ACT 9479-2 LC 07644) Germany
2010 — Mussorgsky Dis-Covered (Preiser Records PR90785) Austria 
2012 — Russian Folksongs In The Key Of New Jazz (участие, Leo CD LR 659) England
2013 — Zehnder / Brennan / Shilkloper «Dehei nöd dehei» Switzerland 
2013 — AlphornExperience «Axxalp» Switzerland 
2014 — Mario Piacentini Sextet «Neant» (Incipit Records) Italy
2015 — Rolf Listevand & Bjergsted Jazz Ensemble «Tourdion» (INNER EAR INE22) Norway
2015 — The Mallet-Horn Jazz Band (Klarthe Records) France
2017 — Yury Markin «On a Large Scale» (FANCYMUSIC, FANCY088) Russia
2019 — FizFuz «Lale - Colours of Eurasia»(Pianissimo Musik) Germany
2019 — Rastko Obradovic Quartet feat. Arkady Shilkloper «The Northern Experience» (AMP Music & Records – AT047) Norway
2020 — Lenny Sendersky & Moon Strings feat. Arkady Shilkloper (tracks 8,9 & 10) «Blues Mizrahi» (LOS 238-2) Norway
2020 — Evelina Petrova, Roberto Dani, Arkady Shilkloper «Beyond the Valley» Global Sonic Norway

Filmography 
1998 — «Moscow Art Trio Live in Poland» XXV International Pianist JAZZ Festival in Kalisz.  Director: Rafal Sory.
1999 — «Moscow Art Trio», Movie director: Manfred Waffender, Duration: 01 h 00 min, Production: © NDR, Available version(s): DE 
2004 — «Legend». Live in Belgrade. Moscow Art Trio, Bulgarian Voices "Angelite", Huun-Huur-To. Live Recording at Sava Center in May 2004
2007 — «Moscow Art Trio» and The Norvegian Chamber Orchestra
2012 — VSP orkestra»."VSP orkestra concert", concert entirely recorded at the jazz festival « la Petite Pierre » (France) on August 11, 2011 with Arkady Shilkloper alphorn & french horn soloist, with Renaud Leipp alphorn,Ghislain Muller vibraphone and composer,Pascal Beck big band director, DVD , © octa prod / France, ref : octaprod001
2013 — "Inspiration and Improvisation". Arkady Shilkloper talks to Sarah Willis on a Horn Hangout live from Berlin about his amazing career, improvising on the horn and on the alpine horn and even makes Sarah sweat a bit ... September 2013 
2013 — «Das Alphorn und die Sonne im Gepäck. Arkady Shilkloper auf dem Weg zur JazzBaltica». Dokumentarfilm, Deutschland, 2013, 58:33 Min., Buch und Regie: Christoph Engel, Produktion: ZDF, 3sat, Erstsendung: 28. September 2013 bei 3sat.

Gallery

References

External links
 Arkady Shilkloper at Myspace.com
 Shilkloper at jazz.ru
 Discography 

Musicians from Moscow
Living people
Russian horn players
Jewish musicians
1956 births
Vienna Art Orchestra members